Aman Verma may refer to:

 Aman Verma (actor) (born 1961), Indian television anchor and actor
 Aman Verma (footballer) (born 1987), English footballer